Rouxmesnil-Bouteilles is a commune in the Seine-Maritime department in the Normandy region in northern France.

Geography
A small ex-farming town but now mostly involved with light industry, situated by the banks of the river Arques in the Pays de Caux at the junction of the D154 and the D154e roads, immediately south of Dieppe.

Population

Places of interest
A sixteenth century priory.
A sixteenth century manorhouse, once the mairie.

See also
Communes of the Seine-Maritime department

References

Communes of Seine-Maritime